Lamar Joseph Johnson (born 4 November 1991) is a footballer who plays as a goalkeeper for Canvey Island and the Saint Lucia national football team.

Club career
Johnson began his career in the youth systems at Charlton Athletic and Thurrock, before joining non-League club Concord Rangers in 2010. Johnson's formative years were spent at Romford, Aveley and Canvey Island, before signing for Grays Athletic in 2012.

In January 2014, following an off the field incident against Bury Town that had occurred on 25 September 2013, Johnson was given a year long ban by The Football Association. Upon the completion of his ban, Johnson re-signed for Grays, going out on loan to Tilbury in order to gain match fitness. Whilst at Grays, loans to Soham Town Rangers and Harlow Town followed, before departing in 2016, re-joining tenants Aveley. On 24 March 2017, Johnson, alongside Canvey Island goalkeeper Conor Gough, joined Chelmsford City on dual-registration as cover for Ross Fitzsimons during Chelmsford's National League South run-in. During the 2017–18 season, Johnson re-signed for Grays, having spells at Hertford Town, Basildon United, Waltham Abbey and Aveley in the following campaign. In July 2019, Canvey Island signed Johnson. In the summer Johnson moved to Canveys near neighbour's Bowers & Pitsea

International career
In November 2019, Johnson received a call-up for Saint Lucia. On 16 November 2019, Johnson kept a clean-sheet on his debut for the country in a 1–0 win against the Dominican Republic.

References

1991 births
Living people
Association football goalkeepers
People with acquired Saint Lucian citizenship
Saint Lucian footballers
English footballers
Saint Lucia international footballers
English people of Saint Lucian descent
Concord Rangers F.C. players
Chelmsford City F.C. players
Aveley F.C. players
Canvey Island F.C. players
Romford F.C. players
Grays Athletic F.C. players
Tilbury F.C. players
Lowestoft Town F.C. players
Soham Town Rangers F.C. players
Harlow Town F.C. players
Hertford Town F.C. players
Basildon United F.C. players
Waltham Abbey F.C. players
Black British sportsmen
Isthmian League players